Sally Davies (born 1956 in Winnipeg, Manitoba, Canada) is a painter and photographer, living and working in New York City's East Village since 1983.

Paintings

She achieved her first public attention in New York in the 1990s with her "Lucky Paintings" and "Lucky Chairs" exhibiting at the OK Harris Gallery, and then at the Gracie Mansion Gallery. Following the Lucky Paintings were the "tattoo paintings", "product paintings", and the  "furniture paintings".

Photography

Although primarily focusing on her paintings in the 1980s, Davies simultaneously began to photograph the East Village. In the mid-1990s she had a fire in her loft on Avenue A and lost almost all her negatives to that date.

In 2000 Davies had her first solo photography exhibit at the Gracie Mansion Gallery in the East Village.  The Alien Photos served as a visual bridge between her paintings and her photography. The final large-scale images consisted of dioramas that she constructed to house the 6-inch alien dolls in Barbie clothes in domestic situations.

Lower East Side and East Village

Davies has been photographing New York City's Lower East Side since 1983. She received a New York City Council Citation on February 6, 2014 from Rosie Mendez for her ongoing documenting of the Lower East Side, and the neighborhood's socio-economic changes.

Davies exhibited these photographs at the now-closed Bernarducci Meisel Gallery in New York City, in 2014 and 2015.

America

In 2016, Davies traveled to Los Angeles. She photographed Venice and Santa Monica and the surrounding neighborhoods. Since then, she has continued to photograph Texas, Florida, and rural America as well as Western Canada.

New Yorkers

In 2021 Davies released the widely acclaimed book of photographs entitled “New Yorkers.”  The book sold out its first edition 2 days after it was published, and went into a 2nd printing. As of April 26, 2021 the book is ranking #1 in New Releases in Street Photography on Amazon

New Yorkers presents 72 intimate portraits of people in their apartments – along with their testimonies and tales and their observations on what it means to be a New Yorker. It captures a glimpse of New York’s alternative scene before its actors are washed away on a wave of gentrification. A cast of drag queens, store owners, doctors, dog walkers, psychics, cab drivers, writers, artists, tattoo artists, gallery owners, photographers, designers, dancers, and musicians (including such legendary New Yorkers as Laurie Anderson, Danny Fields, and William Ivey Long) reveal the diversity, creativity, and humanity at the heart of New York City.

McDonald's Happy Meal Project

After betting with a restaurateur friend that McDonald's food did not spoil, rot, or go mouldy, Sally Davies purchased a Happy Meal from McDonald's and began photographing the food item daily, storing it on her kitchen counter. This commenced the "McDonald's Happy Meal Project". The project began on April 10, 2010 and went viral about three months later. The project demonstrated that the Happy Meal looked the same as it did when it was purchased months and years later. On August 19, 2018 the Happy Meal Project reached it 3051st day. It continues to be documented by Sally Davies.

In the media

Davies' paintings have been featured on:
 HBO's Sex and the City (episode: "The Cheating Curve")
 Risa Bramon Garcia's film, 200 Cigarettes
 Her "Lucky Chairs" have been featured on The Oprah Winfrey Show and Sex and the City.

Davies' portraits include Debra Winger on the cover of Winger's 2008 book "undiscovered" (Simon and Schuster 2008), Elaine Kaufman in Everyone Comes to Elaine's (A. E. Hotchner, Harper Collins Publishers, NYC, 2004), and Jim Cuddy's CD, "The Light That Guides You Home" (Warner Music Canada, 2006), and Jim Cuddy's CD, "Skyscraper Soul" 2011 (Warner Canada)
Her photographs of the 9/11 attacks can be found in "A Democracy of Photos" (Scalo Press, Zurich, Berlin & New York, 2002).

In 2018, Davies art directed and photographed the cover image for Jim Cuddy's album Constellation.

Collections

Her paintings and photographs are in the collections of Harvard Business School, Sarah Jessica Parker, Debra Winger, Michael Patrick King, Phil Scotti, Jane Holzer, Gary Lightbody of Snow Patrol and others. Davies' work is also in the permanent collection of The Museum of the City of New York.

Bibliography
New Yorkers, Ammonite Press, 2021 
Street Photography  "The Woman Who Took Ginberg's Apartment" March 10, 2017
Huffington Post  "New York City Photographer Sally Davies Hits The Streets of Los Angeles" by Michael Sweet Nov 12, 2016
Huffington Post  "Photographer Sally Davies Discusses Women Street Photographers York City" by Michael Sweet Dec 15, 2015
ISO 400, A Podcast by The Phoblographer  "Sally Davies Talks About Photographing the East Village" November 6, 2015 
Women in Photography  "Sally Davies New York City" November 30, 2015
Huffington Post    "New York City in Color: The Photography of Sally Davies" by Michael Sweet July 14, 2015 
The Artist's Forum  Sally Davies New York At Night June 6, 2015
PDN "Five Photos, No Words: Sally Davies" by David Carol November 11, 2003
100 Millimetri  "Street Photography in New York: Sally Davies Interview"  October 24, 2013
Saatchi Online "SpotLight" East 4th Street Car by Sally Davies (photo only)  December 2010
Refinery 29  "Why We're Scared of Happy Meals" August 26, 2010.
 The Happy Meal Project by Sally Davies  "Press and Photographs of the Happy Meal" August 19, 2018.
A Democracy of Photos, Scalo Press Zurich, Berlin, New York, Sept 2002, pp. 710 - "Missing Brother" and pp. 711 - "I Will Not Be Terrorized".
Loft, Mayer Rus and Paul Warchol, Monacelli Press, New York, 1998, p. 106.
Tattoo Review Magazine, "Lucky Charm Art by Sally Davies",  December 1997, pp. 17, 18, 19, 20.
Hot Lava Magazine "Feature Artist Sally Davies "  Sept. 1996, pp. 62, 63, 64.
In Style Magazine, "Objects of Desire", June 1995, p. 40.
Elvis + Marilyn: 2 x Immortal, Geri DePaolo and Wendy McDaris, Rizzoli International Publications, Inc., New York, 1994, p. 130.
Parachute Magazine, "Sally Davies/Franc Palaia", Susan Douglas, July/August/September, 1994, pp. 50 – 51.

References

External links
Sally Davies Official Website

1956 births
Living people
Canadian portrait photographers
Canadian women painters
Artists from Winnipeg
Canadian expatriates in the United States
Canadian women photographers
21st-century Canadian women artists
People from the East Village, Manhattan
21st-century women photographers